The Samoa United Peoples Party was a political party in Samoa. It contested the 2001 election, winning 2.5% of popular votes and 1 out of 49 seats. It has not contested subsequent elections.

The party was deregistered in February 2020 after not paying its registration fee.

References

Political parties in Samoa
Political parties disestablished in 2020